Oscar Theophiel Clothilda Van Rumst (7 February 1910 – 10 July 1960) was a Belgian long-distance runner. He competed in the men's 5000 metres at the 1936 Summer Olympics.

References

External links
 

1910 births
1960 deaths
Athletes (track and field) at the 1936 Summer Olympics
Belgian male long-distance runners
Belgian male steeplechase runners
Olympic athletes of Belgium
Place of birth missing